Jonathan Buatu Mananga (born 27 September 1993) is a professional footballer who plays as a defender for Ligue 2 club Valenciennes. Born in Belgium, he represents the Angola national team.

International career
After representing Belgium at youth level, Buatu was called up to represent Angola at senior level. On 3 August 2014, he made his debut in the 1–0 home friendly win over Ethiopia.

References

External links

1993 births
Living people
Footballers from Liège
Angolan footballers
Angola international footballers
Belgian footballers
Belgium youth international footballers
Angolan expatriate footballers
Belgian expatriate footballers
2019 Africa Cup of Nations players
Association football defenders
Black Belgian sportspeople
RFC Liège players
R.R.F.C. Montegnée players
Standard Liège players
K.R.C. Genk players
R.W.D.M. Brussels F.C. players
Fulham F.C. players
S.K. Beveren players
Rio Ave F.C. players
Royal Excel Mouscron players
C.D. Aves players
Sint-Truidense V.V. players
Eyüpspor footballers
Valenciennes FC players
Belgian Pro League players
Challenger Pro League players
Primeira Liga players
TFF First League players
Ligue 2 players
Angolan expatriate sportspeople in England
Angolan expatriate sportspeople in Portugal
Angolan expatriate sportspeople in Turkey
Angolan expatriate sportspeople in France
Belgian expatriate sportspeople in England
Belgian expatriate sportspeople in Portugal
Belgian expatriate sportspeople in Turkey
Belgian expatriate sportspeople in France
Expatriate footballers in England
Expatriate footballers in Portugal
Expatriate footballers in Turkey
Expatriate footballers in France